Verkhnetroitskoye is a rural locality (a village) in Starosharashlinsky Selsoviet, Bakalinsky District, Bashkortostan, Russia. The population was 16 as of 2010. There is 1 street.

Geography 
Verkhnetroitskoye is located 7 km north of Bakaly (the district's administrative centre) by road. Novotroitskoye is the nearest rural locality.

References 

Rural localities in Bakalinsky District